Thomas Halliday may refer to:

 Thomas Halliday (cricketer) (1904–1977), English cricketer
 Thomas Halliday (engraver) (c. 1780–c. 1854), English coin and medal engraver
 Thomas Halliday (trade unionist) (1835–1919), English trade unionist
 Thomas Halliday (writer), shortlisted for 2022 Wainwright Prize
 Thomas Symington Halliday (1902–1998), Scottish artist and teacher
 Tom Halliday (1909–1975), English footballer

See also
 Tom Holliday (disambiguation)